The defending champion was Joakim Nyström but he lost in the quarterfinals to the seventh seeded, Marcelo Filippini from Uruguay, who went on to win the singles title.

Seeds
A champion seed is indicated in bold text while text in italics indicates the round in which that seed was eliminated.

Draw

Finals

Top half

Section 1

Section 2

Bottom half

Section 3

Section 4

References

Men's Singles